Moraine Hills State Park is an Illinois state park on  in McHenry County, Illinois, United States.

History
The McHenry dam was constructed in 1907 on the Fox River near McHenry, Illinois. The dam was donated to the state in 1924 and a new dam was built in 1934. Property on the west bank of the river was donated to the state Division of Water Resources in the early 1960s. In 1971, the state began to acquire land surrounding Lake Defiance, then constructed park facilities in 1975. Renamed Moraine Hills State Park, the park was opened to the public in October 1976.

See also 
Moraine
Illinois state parks

References

State parks of Illinois
Protected areas of McHenry County, Illinois
Protected areas established in 1939
1939 establishments in Illinois
McHenry, Illinois